Ruben Sørensen is a Danish Olympic middle-distance runner. He represented his country in the men's 1500 meters at the 1976 Summer Olympics. His time was a 3:45.39.

References

1954 births
Living people
Danish male middle-distance runners
Olympic athletes of Denmark
Athletes (track and field) at the 1976 Summer Olympics
People from Randers
Sportspeople from the Central Denmark Region
20th-century Danish people